Eggert (or Egert) is a Germanic given name and surname, deriving from the root *agi meaning "edge". As a given name, Eggert/Egert is masculine and is primarily used in Iceland.  This surname is common among Ashkenazi Jewish families. Notable people with the name include:

Given name
 Eggert Achen (1853–1913), Danish architect
 Eggert Guðmundsson (born 1964), Icelandic football goalkeeper
 Eggert Jóhannesson, Icelandic football manager
 Eggert Jónsson (born 1988), Icelandic football midfielder
 Eggert Magnússon (born 1947), Icelandic businessman, former President of the Football Association of Iceland
 Eggert Ólafsson (1726–1768), Icelandic explorer, writer and conservator of the Icelandic language
 Eggert Reeder (1894–1959), German jurist and civil servant
 Eggert Gíslason Þorsteinsson (1925–1995), Icelandic politician, Minister of Social Affairs

Surname
 Anders Eggert (born 1982), Danish handball player
 Christian Eggert (born 1986), German footballer
 Elmer Eggert (1902–1971), American baseball player
 Franz Xaver Eggert (1802–1876), German glass painter
 Hermann Eggert (1844–1920), German architect
 Joachim Nicolas Eggert (1779–1813), Swedish composer and musical director
 Konstantin Eggert (1883–1955), Russian actor and film director
 Maren Eggert (born 1974), German actress
 Michael Eggert (disambiguation), multiple people, including:
Michael Eggert (businessman) (born 1975), Danish businessmen
Michael Eggert (footballer) (born 1952), German footballer
 Moritz Eggert (born 1965), German composer and pianist
 Nicole Eggert (born 1972), American actress
 Otto Eggert (1874–1944), German geodesist
 Peter Eggert (born 1943), German football player and manager
 Toni Eggert, German luger

Icelandic masculine given names
German-language surnames